Zygaspis kafuensis is a worm lizard species in the family Amphisbaenidae. It is endemic to Zambia. Its type locality is located in the Kafue National Park.

References

Zygaspis
Reptiles of Zambia
Endemic fauna of Zambia
Reptiles described in 1997
Taxa named by Donald George Broadley
Taxa named by Sheila Broadley